The United States Senate Committee on Cuban Relations was formed following the Spanish–American War, in 1899. The Committee was terminated, along with many others, in 1921.

Chairmen of the Senate Committee on Cuban Relations, 1899–1921
 Orville H. Platt (R-CT) 1899–1905
 Henry E. Burnham (R-NH) 1905–1909
 George Sutherland (R-UT) 1909–1911
 Carroll S. Page (R-VT) 1911–1913
 Joseph L. Bristow (R-KS) 1913–1915
 Oscar W. Underwood (D-AL) 1916–1919
 Hiram W. Johnson (R-CA) 1919–1921

See also

 Cuba–United States relations

Cuban Relations
Cuba–United States relations
1899 establishments in Washington, D.C.
1921 disestablishments in Washington, D.C.